Wendy Pini's Masque of the Red Death is a webcomic by the comic creator Wendy Pini.

Based on the original 1842 short story by Edgar Allan Poe, Wendy Pini's Masque of the Red Death is described as follows on the back of the print edition of Volume One:  "In a decadent, perfect future, Anton Prosper uses his vast fortune and scientific genius to seek the ultimate power of life over death.  But when the beautiful prodigy Steffan Kabala enters Prosper's life, he unlocks a tempestuous passion that may send the entire planet hurtling into a bloody maelstrom of destruction."

Episodes of the weekly webcomic began in 2007. Each episode was created first in traditional comic book page format. Wendy Pini produced pages of full-color digital art then broke them down into individual panels. Using simple "tweens" she animated the panels in sequence, often creating additional art to enhance the illusion of movement. Each roughly three-minute-long Flash movie is viewed using a Flash-based web browser viewer. The final episode in the adaptation was posted to the web in mid-2010.

Characters
 Anton Prosper is a wealthy young man seeking the secret of immortality.  He is based on Prince Prospero from the original short story by Edgar Allan Poe.
 Steffan Kabala is the brilliant young scientist who assists Anton in his quest.  He and Anton also become lovers in the course of the story.
 Madame Kabala is Steffan's calculating mother, a famous geneticist in her own right.
 Bunchh is a blue-skinned hermaphrodite party planner responsible for organizing Prosper's fateful Masque Ball.
 Daryel Mirrin, a technician who falls in love with heiress Fronda Trankule, a young woman far above his station.
 Tono Trankule is Fronda's immensely wealthy and powerful father.

Other recurring characters include Bittie and Ix, two virtual reality gossip journalists; and Royess, Anton Prosper's companion black panther.

In print
 A print edition of Masque of the Red Death: Volume 1 was released in October 2008 by Go! Comi. Further print volumes had been planned but the publisher ceased operations in early 2010.

Author
Wendy Pini co-created ElfQuest with Richard Pini.  She is currently working on adapting her version of Masque into both stage and film formats.

Interviews related to Masque
Interview by Brigid Alverson on Digital Strips website.
Interview by Deb Aoki on About.com website.
Interview by Wolfen Moondaughter on Sequential Tart website.
Interview/podcast by "Jeannie" on gfbrobot.com website.

References

External links
The complete Masque animated webcomic
The homepage for Wendy Pini and ElfQuest

Works based on The Masque of the Red Death
American comedy webcomics
2000s webcomics
Webcomics in print
2007 webcomic debuts